This is a list of television and radio stations along with a list of media outlets in and around Boston, Massachusetts, including the Greater Boston area.  As the television media market titled as "Boston-(Manchester)" it stretches as far north as Manchester, New Hampshire, and ranks as the ninth-largest media market, and one of top-ten-largest radio media market in the United States according to Nielsen Media Research.

TV stations 

The Boston television market includes all but the 4 westernmost counties and Bristol County in Massachusetts and the 6 southern counties in New Hampshire, plus Windham County, Vermont, Network owned-and-operated stations are highlighted in bold.

Local cable channels 

Local cable channels
Comcast is the main cable television provider, it also competes against RCN in select parts of the city.

New England Cable News
New England Sports Network
NBC Sports Boston
CatholicTV
Boston Neighborhood Network (public-access television cable TV)

Radio

The Boston radio market is the tenth largest in the country, encompassing over 4 million people in Essex, Middlesex, Norfolk, Plymouth and Suffolk counties.

AM radio

FM radio

Print

Newspapers

Daily
The Boston Globe
The Boston Herald
The Boston Metro, 5 days a week,  49% owned by the Boston Globe

Weekly
The Armenian Mirror-Spectator
The Armenian Weekly

Banker & Tradesman, business weekly
Bay State Banner, African-American weekly
Bay Windows, LGBT weekly
Boston Business Journal
The Christian Science Monitor, daily online, weekly print magazine
Commercial Record, business weekly
DigBoston
The Jewish Advocate
Massachusetts Lawyers Weekly
The Pilot, Catholic weekly
La Semana, Spanish weekly

Bi-weekly and monthly
Just Property, focused on real estate
Just Rentals, focused on real estate
The Rainbow Times, the largest LGBTQ monthly newspaper in Boston, serving all of New England
Sampan, bilingual, Chinese and English 
Spare Change News

Neighborhood papers
 Allston-Brighton TAB
Boston Guardian (effective successor of defunct Boston Courant)
Boston Sun (formerly Back Bay Sun)
Beacon Hill Times
Charlestown Patriot-Bridge
Dorchester Reporter
East Boston Sun Transcript
Fenway News
Hyde Park Tribune
Jamaica Plain Gazette
Mattapan Reporter
Mission Hill Gazette
South End News
West Roxbury Transcript

Inner suburbs:
 Arlington Advocate
 Belmont Citizen-Herald
 Brookline TAB
 Cambridge Chronicle & TAB
 Cambridge Day
 Newton TAB
 Somerville Journal
 Watertown TAB
 "The Patriot Ledger"

Outer suburbs:
The Eagle-Tribune of North Andover
MetroWest Daily News of Framingham
The Lowell Sun of Lowell
"Winchester Star"

College newspapers
 The Berkeley Beacon, Emerson College, weekly
 The Daily Free Press, Boston University, weekly, online daily
 The Harvard Crimson, Harvard University, daily
 The Harvard Voice, Harvard University, weekly
 The Heights, Boston College twice-weekly
 The Hub, Emmanuel College, online
 The Huntington News, Northeastern University, weekly
 The Mass Media, University of Massachusetts Boston, weekly
 The Simmons Voice, Simmons College, weekly
 The Suffolk Journal, Suffolk University, weekly
 The Suffolk Voice, Suffolk University, online daily
 The Tech, Massachusetts Institute of Technology, weekly
 The Tufts Daily, Tufts University, daily
  The 1851 Chronicle, Lasell University, monthly

Wire Services
Associated Press Boston bureau
State House News Service, a local news wire covering Massachusetts state government

Others
Barstool Sports
Big Red & Shiny, online contemporary arts magazine with coverage and arts criticism for Greater Boston and New England
Boston Art Review, a print and online magazine committed to facilitating active discourse around contemporary art in Boston
Boston Common Magazine
The Boston Independent Media Center, provides alternative views
Boston Live Magazine, live music and entertainment
Boston Magazine, a monthly lifestyles magazine
Boston Review, a national political and arts magazine
 Boston Spirit Magazine, full color, glossy luxury gay and lesbian life and style magazine, for Greater Boston and New England
 CommonWealth, online magazine and quarterly print publication about politics and policy in Massachusetts 
 Nieman Lab, online publication covering media and journalism based at Harvard's Nieman Foundation 
 Open Media Boston, progressive online metro news weekly serving the Boston area
 NewBostonPost, conservative news website
 STAT, an online publication covering health and life sciences, owned by The Boston Globe

See also 

Arts and culture in Boston
 Massachusetts media
 Media of cities in Massachusetts: Fall River, MA/Providence, RI, Springfield, Worcester

References

External links 
FCC TV Channel Guide
Boston Media List
Boston Newspaper List
EDGE Boston - gay and lesbian online news and entertainment
Newspapers in Massachusetts
Boston, MA on American Radio Map (Radiomap.us)

Boston

Mass media in Massachusetts
Media, Boston
Boston-related lists